Enlarged Double Lock No. 33 Old Erie Canal is a historic Erie canal lock located at St. Johnsville in Montgomery County, New York. It was built in 1824 and enlarged in 1840.  The south lock was enlarged in 1888.  It is built entirely of large cut limestone blocks mortared with hydraulic cement.  Lock 33 fell into disuse after the opening of the New York State Barge Canal in 1918.  Since 1997, it has been reclaimed and restored by local volunteers.

It was added to the National Register of Historic Places in 2002.

References

Erie Canal parks, trails, and historic sites
Locks on the National Register of Historic Places in New York (state)
Infrastructure completed in 1840
Buildings and structures in Montgomery County, New York
Infrastructure completed in 1888
National Register of Historic Places in Montgomery County, New York